is a Japanese boxer. He competed in the men's welterweight event at the 1976 Summer Olympics. At the 1976 Summer Olympics, he defeated Ju Seok-Kim of South Korea, before losing to Carmen Rinke of Canada.

References

1953 births
Living people
Japanese male boxers
Olympic boxers of Japan
Boxers at the 1976 Summer Olympics
Place of birth missing (living people)
Asian Games medalists in boxing
Boxers at the 1974 Asian Games
Asian Games silver medalists for Japan
Medalists at the 1974 Asian Games
Welterweight boxers